Bernard de Lavinheta (died c. 1530) was a Basque Franciscan from Béarn, known as a teacher of the methods of Raymond Lull.

Life
He studied at Toulouse and taught at Salamanca. Later he came to Paris.

Works
His Explanatio compendiosaque applicatio artis Raymundi Lulli was published in 1523 in Lyon. It combined the theories of Lull with alchemy and an encyclopedic theory. Lavinheta also argues in it that the ars generalis of Lull is a memory technique that goes beyond the method of loci. 

A new edition of his works was published in 1612 by Johann Heinrich Alsted, for Lazarus Zetzner.

References
Paolo Rossi, Stephen Clucas (translator) (2006), Logic and the Art of Memory: the quest for a universal language

Notes

External links
Encyclopedia entry
 Database entry

Year of birth missing
1530s deaths
Spanish Franciscans
Basque people